Atala Thérèse Annette Wartel, née Adrien (2 July 1814 – 6 November 1865), was a French pianist, music educator, composer and critic.

Biography
Born in Paris, Thérèse Wartel was the daughter of the opera singer Martin-Joseph Adrien or Andrien (1767–1822) and the Baroness Gabrielle Constance de Philippy de Bucelly d'Estrées (1782–1854). She was also the sister of the piano virtuoso Rosine-Charlotte DelSarte who was the wife of the renowned French music and movement teacher Francois DelSarte (1811–1871).

She studied music at the Conservatoire, became an accompanist, and from 1831–38 taught as a professor at the Conservatoire. In 1838, she was the first female soloist ever admitted to the Orchestre de la Société des Concerts du Conservatoire.

In 1833, she married the tenor Pierre-François Wartel (1806–1882) and had a son, Émile, who performed for many years at the Théâtre-Lyrique and later established a vocal school of his own.

She died in Paris aged 51.

Works
Wartel composed caprices, fantasies, études, ballads and romances. Selected compositions include:

 Lessons on the Pianoforte Sonatas of Beethoven
 Souvenirs of the Huguenots, fantaisie, Leipzig
 Caprice
 Andante, autograph, 1843
 Six Études de salon pour piano, Op. 10, Paris (1850)
 Andante, Op. 11 (1851)

Wartel also published a number of articles and letters on musical subjects.

References

1814 births
1865 deaths
19th-century classical composers
19th-century French composers
19th-century women composers
Academic staff of the Conservatoire de Paris
Conservatoire de Paris alumni
French women classical composers
French music educators
French Romantic composers
Musicians from Paris
Women music educators